Sir Michael Edward Quinlan, GCB (11 August 1930 – 26 February 2009) was a former British defence strategist and former Permanent Under-Secretary of State for Defence, who wrote and lectured on defence and matters of international security, especially nuclear weapon policies and doctrine, and also on concepts of 'Just War' and related ethical issues.

Early life
Quinlan was born on 11 August 1930 in Hampton, Middlesex, England to Gerald and Roseanne Quinlan. He was educated at Wimbledon College, the Jesuit boys' high school. From 1948 to 1952 he attended Merton College, Oxford, graduating with a Double First in Classics. He completed his national service in the RAF between 1952 and 1954.

Civil Service career
In 1954, Quinlan joined the Air Ministry as a civil servant. He was Private Secretary to two Chiefs of the Air Staff: Sir Thomas Pike from 1962 to 1963, and Sir Charles Elworthy from 1963 to 1965. From 1968 to 1970 he became Director of Defence Policy dealing with arms control issues from where he moved to become the Defence Counsellor in the UK Delegation to NATO until 73.  He was Deputy Secretary (policy and programmes) at the Ministry of Defence (MoD) from 1977 to 1981. He was Permanent Secretary of the Ministry of Defence from 1988 to 1992. These years saw the end of the Cold War and the collapse of the Soviet Union.

Outside the Ministry of Defence he was Permanent Secretary, Department of Employment (1983–88); Deputy Secretary, HM Treasury (1981–82) and Under-Secretary, Cabinet Office (1974–77). He retired from the Civil Service in 1992.

Later life
On retirement, Quinlan became Director of the Ditchley Foundation, holding the position until 1999. In 2001, he became Chairman of The Tablet Trust, publisher of the Catholic newspaper The Tablet.

He was one of the world's foremost experts in deterrence theory, contributing to debate and books in this field. He also wrote his own book on this matter shortly before his death. His contributions were recognised by Gordon Brown, the Prime Minister of the United Kingdom, in a speech given on 17 March 2009. Historian of government Peter Hennessy called him the leading in-house defence intellectual MOD has possessed since World War II.

He died on 26 February 2009.

Honours
As part of the 1991 New Year Honours, Quinlan was appointed Knight Grand Cross of the Order of the Bath (GCB).

Personal life
Quinlan married Mary Finlay in 1965, with whom he had four children including actress and comedy writer Carrie Quinlan. He was a devout Roman Catholic.

References

Bibliography

review:

External links
 Biography on the website of the International Institute for Strategic Studies.
 Another biography at the website of the Oxford Leverhulme Programme on the 'Changing Character of War'.
 
 
 

1930 births
2009 deaths
Permanent Under-Secretaries of State for Employment
Permanent Under-Secretaries of State for Defence
British Roman Catholics
Knights Grand Cross of the Order of the Bath
People educated at Wimbledon College
Alumni of Merton College, Oxford